The Asturias amateur team is composed of Asturian players of Tercera División and lower divisions. This team plays in the UEFA Regions' Cup, and their most important achievement was to qualify to the Final tournament of the 2003 UEFA Regions' Cup, after winning the Spanish stage and winning all their previous matches in the European rounds.

History
The Asturias amateur team was created to defend the Asturian Country in the UEFA Regions' Cup. The team made its debut on 18 May 2000 in 3-2 loss to Andalusia.

Amateur team (UEFA Regions' Cup)

Results summary

Updated to 10 December 2017.

Matches

Source:

See also
Asturias autonomous football team
:Category:Footballers from Asturias

References 

Amateur association football teams
Spanish stage of the UEFA Regions' Cup
Football in Asturias